Neryl acetate is a terpenoid found in citrus oils. It is the acetate ester of nerol, an isomer of the more common fragrance geranyl acetate.  In flavors and perfumery it is used to impart floral and fruity aromas.

See also
 Geranyl acetate

References

Acetate esters